Girard Bay is a bay  long and  wide, indenting the northwest coast of Kyiv Peninsula, Graham Land, between Cape Cloos and Mount Scott. It was discovered by the Belgian Antarctic Expedition, 1897–99, and was named by the French Antarctic Expedition, 1903–05, under Jean-Baptiste Charcot, for Jules Girard of the Paris Société de Géographie.

References

 SCAR Composite Gazetteer of Antarctica.

Bays of Graham Land
Graham Coast